Ong Jian Guo (born 29 January 1989 in Malacca) is a badminton player from Malaysia. Ong was selected to join the Malacca team in 2001, and two years later he moved to Kuala Lumpur to be educated at the Bukit Jalil Sports School. He was the bronze medalist at the 2007 World Junior Championships in the boys' doubles event, and helped the Malaysia men's team won the silver medal at the 2011 Southeast Asian Games in Jakarta, Indonesia. 

Ong left national team in 2014, he became independent player pairing with Lim Khim Wah playing Men's double until 2016. He achieved highest world ranking of 37 in 2017. During this period, he was employed under Klang City Badminton Club ("KCBC") and became a coach of its academy for more than 500 students.

Since 2018, he joined Doublestar Sports in Singapore and has experience in coaching of players from juniors to adult. He leads players to participate Singapore local and international tournaments.

Achievements

BWF World Junior Championships
Boys' doubles

BWF International Challenge/Series  
Men's doubles

Mixed doubles

 BWF International Challenge tournament
 BWF International Series tournament

References

External links
 

1989 births
Living people
People from Malacca
Malaysian sportspeople of Chinese descent
Malaysian male badminton players
Competitors at the 2011 Southeast Asian Games
Competitors at the 2013 Southeast Asian Games
Southeast Asian Games silver medalists for Malaysia
Southeast Asian Games medalists in badminton